The 2013 Primera División del Fútbol Profesional Chileno season (known as the 2013 Torneo Transición Petrobras for sponsorship reasons) was the 82nd season of top-flight football in Chile. Huachipato was the defending champion.

Format changes
Starting in 2013, the ANFP's Council of Club Presidents approved a change from a season contained entirely within a calendar year to a season that spans two calendar years. To manage this transition, the 2013 season was held with only a single championship instead of the traditional Apertura and Clausura format. The Apertura and Clausura format returned for the 2013–14 season, but without the playoff rounds conducted in the past.

Teams
Eighteen teams will be competing in the Primera División for the 2013 season, fifteen of whom are returning from the 2012 season. Universidad de Concepción, Unión San Felipe and La Serena were relegated last season after finishing 15th, 17th and 18th overall, respectively. They were replaced by San Marcos, Ñublense and Everton, the 2012 Primera B winner, runner-up and fourth place, respectively.

Torneo de Transición
The Torneo de Transición began in January and ended in May.

Classification stage
The Classification Stage began in January and ended in May.

Standings

Results

Top goalscorers

Relegation

Relegation/promotion playoffs

References

External links
ANFP 
2013 Torneo Transición at Soccerway
Season regulations 

Primera División de Chile tournaments
Primera División de Chile seasons
2013 in South American football leagues
2013 in Chilean football

es:Torneo Transición 2013 (Chile)
sv:Primera División de Chile 2013
zh:2013年智利足球甲级联赛